The 2008 Banka Koper Slovenia Open was a women's tennis tournament played on outdoor hard courts. It was the 4th edition of the Banka Koper Slovenia Open, and was part of the Tier IV Series of the 2008 WTA Tour. It took place in Portorož, Slovenia, from 21 July until 27 July 2008. Eighth-seeded Sara Errani won the singles title and earned $22,900 first-prize money.

Finals

Singles

 Sara Errani defeated  Anabel Medina Garrigues 6–3, 6–3
 It was Errani's 2nd title of the year, and overall.

Doubles

 Anabel Medina Garrigues /  Virginia Ruano Pascual defeated  Vera Dushevina /  Ekaterina Makarova 6–4, 6–1

External links
 Official website
 ITF tournament edition details
 Tournament draws

Banka Koper Slovenia Open
2008
2008 in Slovenian tennis